Hagsatera is a genus of flowering plants from the orchid family, Orchidaceae. There are two known species, native to Mexico and Guatemala:

Hagsatera brachycolumna (L.O.Williams) R.González
Hagsatera rosilloi R.González

See also

List of Orchidaceae genera

References

Pridgeon, A.M., Cribb, P.J., Chase, M.A. & Rasmussen, F. eds. (1999). Genera Orchidacearum 1. Oxford Univ. Press.
Pridgeon, A.M., Cribb, P.J., Chase, M.A. & Rasmussen, F. eds. (2001). Genera Orchidacearum 2. Oxford Univ. Press.
Pridgeon, A.M., Cribb, P.J., Chase, M.A. & Rasmussen, F. eds. (2003). Genera Orchidacearum 3. Oxford Univ. Press
Berg Pana, H. 2005. Handbuch der Orchideen-Namen. Dictionary of Orchid Names. Dizionario dei nomi delle orchidee. Ulmer, Stuttgart

Laeliinae genera
Laeliinae